Tamim Surkhorodi (born 22 May 2001) is an Afghan cricketer. He made his first-class debut for Amo Region in the 2017–18 Ahmad Shah Abdali 4-day Tournament on 13 November 2017. He made his List A debut for Speen Ghar Region in the 2018 Ghazi Amanullah Khan Regional One Day Tournament on 25 July 2018. He made his Twenty20 debut on 13 October 2019, for Speen Ghar Tigers in the 2019 Shpageeza Cricket League.

References

External links
 

2001 births
Living people
Afghan cricketers
Amo Sharks cricketers
Place of birth missing (living people)
21st-century Afghan people